Martin Lang may refer to:

Martin Lang (canoeist) (born 1968), German slalom canoeist
Martin Lang (fencer) (born 1949), American fencer
Martin Lang (rugby league) (born 1975), Australian rugby league footballer